Hussain El-Din Hamed (born 17 September 1963) is an Egyptian wrestler. He competed in the men's freestyle 68 kg at the 1984 Summer Olympics.

References

External links
 

1963 births
Living people
Egyptian male sport wrestlers
Olympic wrestlers of Egypt
Wrestlers at the 1984 Summer Olympics
Place of birth missing (living people)
20th-century Egyptian people